Martiňák (or Čeněk) is a pond located in a cadastral area of Dolní Počernice in Prague, Czech Republic (in Nature park Klánovice-Čihadla). Its inflows are streams Chvalka and one no name stream. Runoff from the pond flows into Rokytka. The pond has irregular shape. There are Madarova street on the dam of the pond.

References 

Geography of Prague
Ponds of Europe